Thomas Armitage (25 April 1848 – 21 September 1922) was an English first-class cricketer, who in 1877 took part in what are retrospectively recognised as the first two Test matches played by England. The players in these matches having been alphabetically sorted, Armitage is the #1 capped England player.

Life and career
Armitage was born in Sheffield, Yorkshire. He made his first-class debut for Yorkshire against Nottinghamshire at Trent Bridge in 1872, opening the batting in the first innings. He failed to make much of an impression in the game, scoring 0 and 1, taking 0–19 from eight overs and taking no catches. He next appeared for Yorkshire in 1874 against a United South of England XI, but again did little.

Armitage's county cricket career took off in 1875, when he took 22 wickets in nine matches at just 7.59 apiece, including 7–27 against Derbyshire, and recorded the first of his four half-centuries, 68 not out against Surrey. In 1876, he played 12 games and claimed 45 wickets, taking 13–46 in a match against Surrey bowling underarm lobs, and making his highest first-class score, of 95, against Middlesex.

Armitage was selected for the tour of Australia that winter, and in the spring of 1877 played in the first two Test matches, both at Melbourne. He is credited with being the first player to represent England, due to alphabetical order, and is therefore number one in the order of Test caps. However, he did almost nothing, bowling only 12 balls and scoring just 33 runs in three innings, and he never played for England again.

He played for Yorkshire for a couple of years more, achieving some success in 1877, when he took 42 wickets, but he declined in 1878 and played in only one match in 1879, for United North of England against London United. He then emigrated to the United States, and seven years after his previous game he made one final first-class appearance, for Players of United States of America against Gentlemen of Philadelphia, making 58 and taking 2–25.

Armitage died in Pullman, Chicago, in the US state of Illinois, at the age of 74.

Armitage's grandson, also called Tom, was a professional footballer for Sheffield Wednesday F.C. who died on New Year's Eve 1923, after suffering an injury on the pitch a few days earlier. Another grandson, Len Armitage, was also a professional footballer.

References

External links
 

1848 births
1922 deaths
English cricketers
England Test cricketers
Yorkshire cricketers
Cricketers from Sheffield
United North of England Eleven cricketers
Players of United States of America cricketers
English cricketers of 1864 to 1889